The Norway women's national under-19 football team represents Norway at the UEFA Women's Under-19 Championship and the FIFA U-20 Women's World Cup.

History

UEFA Women's Under-19 Championship

The Norwegian team has qualified for the UEFA Women's Under-19 Championship finals on 16 occasions, reaching the final four times.

FIFA U-20 Women's World Cup

Current squad
The following 20 players were named to the squad to take part in the 2022 UEFA Women's Under-19 Championship qualification section in October 2021.

Head coach: Hege Riise

Coaches
Terje Liknes (1997–1999)
Trine Lise Andersen (1999–2000)
Jarl Torske (2001–2014)
Nils Lexerød (2014–2019)
Alexander Straus (2019–2021)
Hege Riise (2021–2022)
Lena Tyriberget (2022–present)

See also

 Norway women's national football team
 Norway women's national under-17 football team
 FIFA U-20 Women's World Cup
 UEFA Women's Under-19 Championship

References

External links
Official website at Norwegian Football Federation (in Norwegian)

Women's national under-19 association football teams
under
European women's national under-19 association football teams